Arabic International Phonetic Alphabet (AIPA) is a system of Phonetic transcription, based on the Arabic alphabet, to adapt the International Phonetic Alphabet (IPA) to the Arabic script. In addition to equivalence with the symbols of the IPA, IAPA has some additional symbols. It has 186 symbols and 2 fonts have been developed for its use.

Consonants

Vowels 
The symbols written here are approximation since the original symbols don't exist in unicode.

Notes and references

Bibliography 
(online copy)
 Computer Research Institute, King Abdulaziz University, Computer Research Institute: Towards a Digital Life'', 200?. (online copy)

See also 
 Help:IPA/Arabic
 English phonetic alphabet
 International Phonetic Alphabet
 Americanist phonetic notation
 Uralic Phonetic Alphabet

Arabic language
Phonetic alphabets
Spelling alphabets